The George W. Beadle Award is a scientific prize given by the Genetics Society of America to individuals who have made “outstanding contributions” to Genetics. The Award was established in 1999 and named in honor of George Wells Beadle, who won the Nobel Prize in Physiology or Medicine in 1958.

Laureates 
Source: Genetics Society of America
 1999 Michael Ashburner
 2000 John Sulston and Robert Waterston

2001 Gerald Fink
2002 André Goffeau and Robert K. Mortimer
2003 Gerald M. Rubin and Allan C. Spradling
 2004 Norbert Perrimon, Harvard Medical School
 2005 Thomas C. Kaufman, Indiana University
 2006 Fred Sherman, University of Rochester
 2007 Robert K. Herman, University of Minnesota
 2008 Mark Johnston, Washington University School of Medicine
 2009 Jay C. Dunlap, Dartmouth Medical School
 2010 William M. Gelbart, Harvard University
 2011 Joseph R. Ecker, Salk Institute for Biological Studies
 2012 Therese Markow, University of California, San Diego
 2013 R. Scott Hawley, Stowers Institute for Medical Research
 2014 Hugo J. Bellen, Baylor College of Medicine
 2015 John Postlethwait, University of Oregon
 2016 Susan Celniker, Lawrence Berkeley National Laboratory
 2017 Susan A. Gerbi, Brown University
 2018 Philip Hieter, University of British Columbia
 2019 Michael P. Snyder, Stanford University
 2020 Julie Ahringer, Cambridge University

See also

 List of genetics awards

References 

American science and technology awards
Genetics awards
1999 establishments in the United States
Awards established in 1999